Mike MacDonald (born November 27, 1980 in Berkeley, California, United States) is a retired rugby union footballer who formerly played for Leeds Carnegie in the RFU Championship and English Premiership. He played for the United States, and his usual position was at prop.

Youth and college
MacDonald began playing rugby during his sophomore year of high school in 1997. MacDonald graduated from Miramonte High School in 1999, and followed in the footsteps of his brother who also played rugby. MacDonald also excelled in wrestling and football, finishing 3rd in state wrestling during his senior year of High School.

MacDonald would go on to win four rugby National Championships with the University of California, Berkeley; where he was named an All-American five times between 2000 and 2004, and following the 2004 national championship was named tournament MVP.

Professional career
MacDonald  played professionally in England from 2005 to 2012, first with the Worcester Warriors from 2005–06, and then with Leeds Carnegie from 2007–2012. MacDonald was a key player for Leeds during the 2006–07 season which saw Leeds win National League 1 and gain promotion to the Premiership, with MacDonald scoring 10 tries that season, a remarkable scoring rate for a front row player. MacDonald was named Leeds' Player of the Season following the 2007–08 Premiership season, and was named captain for the 2008–09 season. In June 2011 MacDonald renewed his contract with Leeds Carnegie for another two years. In April 2012 MacDonald was released from Leeds.

International career
MacDonald's debut for the United States was against Fiji on June 30, 2000. MacDonald has represented the USA in three Rugby World Cups – 2003, 2007 and 2011. At the 2011 Rugby World Cup, MacDonald broke two US records: he tallied his 63rd cap, surpassing Luke Gross as the United States' most-capped player,  and made his 11th appearance in a Rugby World Cup match, breaking the record held by Alec Parker.  MacDonald was named Man of the Match in the United States' win over Russia at the 2011 Rugby World Cup; MacDonald was key as the US scrum made Russia wilt under pressure and MacDonald was outstanding at the breakdown.

Coaching career 
MacDonald was signed on as an assistant coach of the California Golden Bears rugby team in 2011. Since his joining of the team as the forwards coach in the 2011–12 season, Cal Rugby has made seven 15's national championship appearances, including two victories in 2016 and 2017.

See also
 United States national rugby union team
 Leeds Carnegie

References

External links
 Leeds profile
 

1980 births
Living people
American rugby union players
American expatriate sportspeople in England
Expatriate rugby union players in England
Rugby union props
Leeds Tykes players
Miramonte High School alumni
Sportspeople from Berkeley, California
United States international rugby union players
California Golden Bears rugby players
American expatriate rugby union players